William Harrison Johnson (4 January 1876 – 17 July 1940) was an English professional footballer.

Club career
Johnson played for Ecclesfield Church before joining Sheffield United.

He won the 1902 FA Cup Final with Sheffield United, having already lifted the trophy in 1899. That was a year after the team won the 1897–98 Football League; they were runners-up the seasons before and after.

His sons Harry and Tom also became noted footballers for the Blades.

International career
He represented England at international level, scoring on his debut against Ireland, on 17 March 1900. He played six games at international level, his last appearance in an England shirt being three years after his debut, in a match versus Scotland. He also represented the Football League on one occasion.

Honours
Sheffield United

Football League Division One champions: 1897–98
Runners-up: 1896-97, 1899–1900
FA Cup winners: 1899, 1902
Finalists: 1901

References

1876 births
1940 deaths
People from Ecclesfield
English footballers
England international footballers
Footballers from Sheffield
Sheffield United F.C. players
Association football wing halves
English Football League players
English Football League representative players
FA Cup Final players